Kellie Anne Harrington (born 11 December 1989) is an Irish amateur boxer, amateur World champion and an Olympic gold medallist.

She was a silver medalist in the light welterweight division at the 2016 Women's World Boxing Championships. She won the gold medal in the lightweight division at the 2018 Women's World Boxing Championships and won the gold medal in the lightweight division at the Tokyo 2020 Olympic Games on 8 August 2021.

Career

She won a silver medal in the lightweight division at the 2017 Women's European Union Boxing Championships and a bronze at the 2018 Women's European Boxing Championships.

She won the gold medal in the lightweight division at the 2018 Women's World Boxing Championships. She was the silver medallist in the light welterweight division at the 2016 Women's World Boxing Championships.

2020 Summer Olympics
Harrington won the 2020 European Boxing Olympic Qualification Tournament, by defeating Caroline Dubois on a split decision in the final.

Harrington was part of the Ireland team at the 2020 Summer Olympics. She was one of the flag bearers for Ireland at the opening ceremony on 23 July. She competed in the lightweight division of the boxing competition. In her first fight, she defeated Rebecca Nicoli 5–0 to advance to the quarter-finals, where she then defeated Imane Khelif 5–0 to guarantee at least a bronze medal. In her semi-final on 5 August, Harrington defeated Sudaporn Seesondee 3–2 to advance to the final. In her final on 8 August, Harrington defeated Beatriz Ferreira 5–0 winning the gold medal, becoming Ireland's third Olympic boxing champion. President Michael D. Higgins, Taoiseach Micheál Martin congratulated Harrington on her win, along with Katie Taylor and Michael Carruth.

Recognition

For International Women's Day in 2022, An Post launched a stamp collection of Irish sports women which featured Harrington and others.

Harrington was joint grand marshal with Ellen Keane at the Dublin St Patrick's Day parade on 17 March 2022.

In 2022, she was awarded the freedom of Dublin city.

Personal life
Harrington is from Dublin's north inner city and is a member of St. Mary's Boxing Club, Tallaght. At age 15, she developed an interest in boxing, and attempted to join the local boxing club, only to be told that they would not accept girls. But Harrington persisted, was eventually admitted, and made rapid progress in her boxing career.

She has stated that she intends to return to her part-time cleaning job at St Vincent's Psychiatric Hospital in Dublin, regardless of her result at the Olympics.

Harrington has been in a relationship with Mandy Loughlin since 2009 after meeting her through boxing. This made her one of at least 180 openly gay athletes at the 2020 Olympic games. They married in Dublin on 8 April 2022.

In October 2022, Harrington released her autobiography called Kellie which was written with Roddy Doyle.

References

External links
 
 

1989 births
AIBA Women's World Boxing Championships medalists
Boxers at the 2019 European Games
European Games medalists in boxing
European Games silver medalists for Ireland
Irish women boxers
Irish LGBT sportspeople
Light-welterweight boxers
Lightweight boxers
Living people
Sportspeople from South Dublin (county)
Olympic gold medalists for Ireland
Medalists at the 2020 Summer Olympics
Olympic medalists in boxing
Boxers at the 2020 Summer Olympics
Olympic boxers of Ireland